Magic United Football Club is a semi-professional soccer club based in Carrara, Queensland, Australia. Magic United play in the Football Queensland Premier League 2, the third flight of the Football Queensland administrative division and the fourth flight of Australian soccer. The club has won both a premiership and a championship within the Gold Coast Premier League, the then top flight of the Football Queensland South Coast administrative division. The competition has since been restructured and renamed to the Football Queensland Premier League 3 − South Coast.

Established in 2006, Magic United were regular contenders within the Gold Coast Premier League. The club was one of the founding members of the Football Queensland Premier League 2 when the league was established in 2021.

The club is affiliated with Gold Coast Knights, together forming a 'Total Football Academy', specialising in coaching programs for children and teenagers aged 4 to 18 in partnership with schools across South East Queensland.

Honours

Football South Coast 

 Gold Coast Premier League (first tier)
 Premiership
 Winners (1): 2015
 Championship
 Winners (1): 2015

See also 

 Football Queensland
 Football Queensland South Coast

References

External links 

 Club website
 Facebook page

2006 establishments in Australia
Association football clubs established in 2006
Soccer teams on the Gold Coast, Queensland
Carrara, Queensland